Sue Lopez,  (born 1 September 1945) is an English former international footballer. She spent her entire club career with Southampton, except for a season in Italy's Serie A with Roma in 1971. A leading advocate of the women's game in England, Lopez has also worked as a coach, administrator and writer since her retirement from playing.

Playing career
At the age of 21, in 1966, Lopez made her debut for Southampton WFC. She was a regular in the side for almost twenty years until her retirement from playing in 1985. It was in the 1970s, when women's football was in its infancy, that Lopez and her Southampton dominated the Women's FA Cup.

Southampton, with Lopez's efforts, won the cup eight times between 1971 and 1983, appearing in eleven consecutive finals in that period. Lopez also won 22 caps as an England international, between 1973 and 1979.

Coaching
On retirement, in 1986, Lopez used her experience and knowledge of the game to coach women's football. This led to Lopez gaining the FA Advance Licence in 1991. In 1996 she gained the UEFA 'A' Licence conversion. Lopez was part-time manager of the Welsh national women's team in 1995–96. From then, until 2000 Lopez served as the Hampshire Football Association's Coaching and Development Officer.

Lopez was appointed director of women's football at Southampton FC in 2001. She took over managing the Southampton Saints first team as part of the role in 2003. In 2005 the Southampton male club were relegated and scrapped their women's setup to save money, making Lopez redundant in the process.

Honours

Club
 Southampton W.F.C.	
 FA Women's Cup:  Winner 1971, 1972, 1973, 1975, 1976, 1978, 1979, 1981

National team
England

 UEFA Women's Championship: Third place 1969, Fourth place 1979
 World cup: Fourth place 1970 (held in Italy), Sixth place 1971 (held in Mexico)

Individual

 Top scorer 1969 European Competition for Women's Football with four goals

Recognition
In 2001, Lopez became The Sunday Times Sportswomen of the Year Coach of the Year. Lopez was awarded the MBE for services to women's football, in 2000. In 2004 Lopez was inducted into the English Football Hall of Fame. She remains dedicated to improving the profile of the women' game in England.

Publications
In 1997, Lopez published Women on the Ball, a women's football handbook tracing the history and development of the game in England and abroad.

References

Further reading

External links
English Hall of Fame profile
Sue Lopez joins the Hall of Fame

1945 births
Living people
English women's footballers
Members of the Order of the British Empire
English Football Hall of Fame inductees
England women's international footballers
English expatriate women's footballers
Footballers from Southampton
Women's national association football team managers
Serie A (women's football) players
English women's football managers
Women's association football forwards
Southampton Women's F.C. players
Female association football managers
English expatriate sportspeople in Italy
English people of Spanish descent
Roma Calcio Femminile players
Expatriate women's footballers in Italy